Sarcodon regalis is a rare species of tooth fungus in the family Bankeraceae. It was described as new to science in 1975 by Dutch mycologist Rudolph Arnold Maas Geesteranus. It is found in Europe, where it usually associates with oak and sweet chestnut; pine has been reported as another associate. The surface features adpressed scales that are broadest in the centre, narrowing toward the margin. The spines on the cap underside are 1.5–3 mm long; initially pale, they become brown to purplish brown after the spores mature. The spores are roughly spherical, measuring 5–6.5 by 4–5 μm.

References

External links

Fungi described in 1975
Fungi of Europe
regalis